Gantyada is a village in Vizianagaram district of the Indian state of Andhra Pradesh. This village is headquarter of Gantyada mandal.

References 

Villages in Vizianagaram district
Mandal headquarters in Vizianagaram district